Touch Down 2 Cause Hell is the sixth studio album by American rapper Boosie Badazz. The album was released on May 26, 2015, by  Trill Entertainment, Bad Azz and Atlantic Records.

Background
In April 2014, Boosie Badazz announced his sixth studio album would be titled Touchdown 2 Cause Hell and would be released on July 15, 2014. In May 2014, Badazz explained the album title to HotNewHipHop, saying:

Singles
"Like a Man" featuring Rich Homie Quan, was released as the album's second single on November 17, 2014. "Retaliation" was released as the album's third single on May 4, 2015. Both mixed by Cameron Cartee.

Critical reception

Touch Down 2 Cause Hell received positive reviews from music critics. At Metacritic, which assigns a normalized rating out of 100 to reviews from critics, the album received an average score of 74, which indicates "generally favorable reviews", based on 10 reviews. Marcus Dowling of HipHopDX said, "Released from prison, Boosie turns over a new leaf on Touch Down 2 Cause Hell. An honest man now doing honest work, his mental clarity benefits his lyrical directness. The end result is an album that is as much a wild party as it is brutally honest. In achieving each of these goals without feeling too much like it’s placating Boosie’s lifelong fans or pop radio expectations, it excels in walking a fine line and being a tremendous listen."

Commercial performance
Touch Down 2 Cause Hell debuted at number three on the Billboard 200, selling 59,000 copies in the United States. Following its second week on sale, the album had sold 78,000 copies.

Track listing

Charts

Weekly charts

Year-end charts

References

2015 albums
Lil Boosie albums
Atlantic Records albums
Albums produced by Kane Beatz
Albums produced by London on da Track